Kenneth Jonassen (born 3 July 1974) is a badminton player from Denmark, who won Danish national and international titles during the first decade of the 21st century. The big, hard fighting Dane was often ranked among the top few singles players of that era, but was rather overshadowed by his fellow countryman Peter Gade.

He played badminton at the 2004 Summer Olympics in men's singles, losing in the round of 32 to Chen Hong of China. Jonassen reached the quarterfinals of several Badminton World Championships but never quite made it to the medal rounds.

He won the gold medal at the 2008 European Badminton Championships, late in his career. This, along with victories in the 2003 Korea Open and the 2004 Singapore Open were perhaps his most impressive achievements.

Major achievements

IBF World Grand Prix 
The World Badminton Grand Prix sanctioned by International Badminton Federation (IBF) from 1983 to 2006.

Men's singles

References

External links
BWF Profile

1974 births
Living people
People from Herning Municipality
Danish male badminton players
Badminton players at the 2000 Summer Olympics
Badminton players at the 2004 Summer Olympics
Badminton players at the 2008 Summer Olympics
Olympic badminton players of Denmark
Sportspeople from the Central Denmark Region